Hidden City or The Hidden City may refer to:

Film and television
 Bomba and the Hidden City, a 1951 American film directed by Ford Beebe
 Hidden City (film), a 1987 British film directed by Stephen Poliakoff
 The Hidden City (film), a documentary film directed by Víctor Moreno
 "The Hidden City", a 1989 episode of science program Nova

Literature
 The Hidden City, an 1891 novel by Walt McDougall
 The Hidden City, a 1930 novel by Philip Gibbs
 The Hidden City, a 1990 novel by Charles de Lint
 The Hidden City (novel), a 1995 fantasy novel by David Eddings

Other uses
 Hidden City (album), a 2016 album by the Cult
 Hidden city ticketing, an airline booking technique